Lyman Farwell (December 19, 1864 – November 4, 1933) was an American architect and politician. As the co-founder of the architectural firm Dennis and Farwell, he designed many buildings in Los Angeles County, including The Magic Castle. He also served in the California State Assembly.

Early life
Farwell was born on December 19, 1864 in St. Paul, Minnesota. He graduated from the Massachusetts Institute of Technology in 1887, and he studied at the École des Beaux-Arts in Paris in 1890-1891.

Career

Farwell began his career by working for McKim, Mead & White in New York City in 1892-1894. From 1895 to 1913, he was a partner in Dennis and Farwell, an architectural firm he co-founded with Oliver Perry Dennis. They designed several houses in Los Angeles, including Rollin B. Lane's house in Hollywood in 1909, later known as the Magic Castle. In 1911-1912, they designed the police station in Boyle Heights. Outside Los Angeles, they designed a house on Balboa Island in Newport Beach, a hotel in Long Beach, and a bank building in Pasadena. Farwell also designed the San Bernardino County Hospital.

Farwell served as a member of the California State Assembly twice from 1911 to 1915. He also served on the Planning Commission for the City of Los Angeles. He was a director of the Better America Federation.

Personal life and death
With his wife, nee Flora A. Howes, Farwell had three sons. They resided at 444 South Lorraine Boulevard in Los Angeles.

Farwell died of a heart attack on November 4, 1933 in Los Angeles, at age 69. His funeral was held at St James' Episcopal Church, and he was buried in the Rosedale Cemetery.

References

External links
Join California Lyman Farwell

1864 births
1933 deaths
People from Saint Paul, Minnesota
Massachusetts Institute of Technology alumni
American alumni of the École des Beaux-Arts
Architects from Los Angeles
20th-century American architects
Republican Party members of the California State Assembly
20th-century American politicians